is a Japanese actor from Nara in the Kansai region.

Life and career
He is currently attached to Burning Production. He stands at 183 centimeters. He practices martial arts and performs his own stunts in movies.

Filmography

Films
1988: Shiro and Marilyn
1989: Tokyo: The Last War
1992: The Setting Sun
1992: Gekashitsu
1993: Crime Broker
1994: The Seventh Floor - Mitsuru.
1995: Crying Freeman
1997: Drive - Advanced Model.
1997: Sandy Whitelaw
1998: Godzilla – Masaya Katō
2000: Schoolday of the Dead
2000: Brother
2000: Women of the Night
2000: Okinawa Rendez-vous
2001: Agitator
2001: Good Advice
2002: Muscle Heat
2003: Aragami
2003: Samurai Resurrection
2003: Gozu
2003: The Man In White
2006: Fighter in the Wind
2006: Sakura
2007: Unfair: The Movie
2009: Shinjuku Incident – Toshinari Eguchi.
2015: The Edge of Sin
2016: Unrequited Love
2016: Shimauma – Shimauma
2016: Sanada 10 Braves – Sanada Yukimura
2017: Re:Born
2019: The Nikaidos' Fall – Tatsuya Nikaido
2019: Kingdom – Si Shi
2019: Sleep in the Shadows – Fuyuki Hazama
2019: We Make Antiques! Kyoto Rendezvous
2020: The Gun 2020
2020: The Payoff
2020: Sakura – Mizoguchi
2020: Hope – Detective Teranuma
2020: Dancing in Her Dreams
2021: Nishinari Goro's 400 Million Yen
2021: Gunkan Shōnen – Genkai Sakamoto
2022: Kingdom 2: Far and Away – Si Shi
2022: Lightning Over the Beyond
2023: Song of Kamuy
2023: Bad City – Hirayama
2023: My Missing Valentine – Hajime's father
2023: See Hear Love

Television
2002: Toshiie and Matsu – Asano Nagamasa
2005: Yoshitsune – Minamoto no Yoshitomo
2005: The Kindaichi Case Files – Isamu Kenmochi
2010: Saka no Ue no Kumo – Arima Ryōkitsu
2013: Yae's Sakura – Itagaki Taisuke
2018: Manpuku
2018: Itsumademo Shiroi Hane
2019: Idaten – Yōtarō Sugimura
2021: The Grand Family – Ichinose
2022: DCU: Deep Crime Unit – Ichiro Kimi

Video games
2002: Maximo: Ghosts to Glory – Ghastly Gus, Captain Cadaver
2005: Romancing SaGa – Prince Neidhart, Cornelio
2006: Secret of Evangelion
2007: Secret of Evangelion Portable
2008: Ryū ga Gotoku Kenzan! – Yoshioka Seijuro

References

External links
Official website

1963 births
Living people
Japanese male film actors
Japanese male television actors
Japanese male video game actors
Japanese male voice actors
People from Nara, Nara
20th-century Japanese male actors
21st-century Japanese male actors